Hayes Dockrell (16 March 1907 – 4 January 1970) was an Irish water polo player. He competed in the men's tournament at the 1928 Summer Olympics.

References

1907 births
1970 deaths
Irish male water polo players
Olympic water polo players of Ireland
Water polo players at the 1928 Summer Olympics
Sportspeople from Dublin (city)